Patch-type granuloma annulare (also known as macular granuloma annulare) is a skin condition of unknown cause, more commonly affecting women between 30 and 70 years of age, characterized by flat or slightly palpable erythematous or red-brown skin lesions.

See also 
 Granuloma annulare
 Skin lesion

References 

Monocyte- and macrophage-related cutaneous conditions